Avidyā (Sanskrit: अविद्या; Pāli: अविज्जा, Avijjā; Tibetan phonetic: ma rigpa) in Buddhist literature is commonly translated as "ignorance". The concept refers to ignorance or misconceptions about the nature of metaphysical reality, in particular about the impermanence and anatta doctrines about reality. It is the root cause of Dukkha (suffering, pain, unsatisfactoriness), and asserted as the first link, in Buddhist phenomenology, of a process that leads to repeated birth.

Avidyā is mentioned within the Buddhist teachings as ignorance or misunderstanding in various contexts:
 Four Noble Truths
 The first link in the twelve links of dependent origination
 One of the three poisons within the Mahayana Buddhist tradition
 One of the six root kleshas within the Mahayana Abhidharma teachings
 One of the ten fetters in the Theravada tradition 
 Equivalent to moha within the Theravada Abhidharma teachings

Within the context of the twelve links of dependent origination, avidya is typically symbolised by a person who is blind or wearing a blindfold.

Etymology
Avidyā is a Vedic Sanskrit word, and is a compound of a- prefix and vidya, meaning "not vidya". The word vidya is derived from the Sanskrit root vid, which means "to see, to knowingly-see, to know". Therefore, avidya means to "not see, not know". The vid*-related terms appear extensively in the Rigveda and other Vedas.

In Vedic literature, avidya refers to "ignorance, spiritual ignorance, illusion"; in early Buddhist texts, states Monier-Williams, it means "ignorance with non-existence".

The word is derived from the Proto-Indo-European root *weid-, meaning "to see" or "to know". It is a cognate with the Latin verb vidēre ("to see") and English wit.

Overview
Avidya is explained in different ways or on different levels within different Buddhist teachings or traditions. On the most fundamental level, it is ignorance or misunderstanding of the nature of reality;  more specifically about the nature of not-Self and dependent origination doctrines. Avidya is not lack of information, states Peter Harvey, but a "more deep seated misperception of reality". Gethin calls Avidya as 'positive misconception', not mere absence of knowledge. It is a key concept in Buddhism, wherein Avidya about the nature of reality, rather than sin, is considered the basic root of Dukkha. Removal of this Avidya leads to overcoming of Dukkha.

While Avidyā found in Buddhism and other Indian philosophies is often translated as "ignorance", states Alex Wayman, this is a mistranslation because it means more than ignorance. He suggests the term "unwisdom" to be a better rendition. The term includes not only ignorance out of darkness, but also obscuration, misconceptions, mistaking illusion to be reality or impermanent to be permanent or suffering to be bliss or non-self to be self (delusions). Incorrect knowledge is another form of Avidya, states Wayman.

In other contexts, Avidya includes not knowing or not understanding the nature of phenomena as impermanent, the Four Noble Truths, other Buddhist doctrines, or the path to end suffering. Sonam Rinchen states Avidya in the context of the twelve links, that "[Ignorance] is the opposite of the understanding that the person or other phenomena lack intrinsic existence. Those who are affected by this ignorance create actions which precipitate them into further worldly existence." Not understanding the Four Noble Truths, or its implications, is also Avidya.

In Buddhist traditions
Avidya appears as a major item of discussion in two doctrines about the nature of reality, in various Buddhist traditions. One relates to the Anatta (Anatman) doctrine, that is ignorance or misconceptions about "Self", when in reality there is only non-Self according to Buddhism. The second relates to Anicca doctrine, that is ignorance or misconceptions about "permanence", when the nature of reality is impermanence.

Theravada

Bhikkhu Bodhi states that Avidya is an important part of the Theravada Abhidharma teachings about dependent arising about conditions that sustain the wheel of birth and death. One such condition is the karmic formations that arise from ignorance. In other words, states Bodhi, ignorance (avijja) obscures "perception of the true nature of things just as a cataract obscures perception of visible objects". In the Suttanta literature, this ignorance refers to the non-knowledge of the Four Noble Truths. In the Abhidharma literature, in addition to the Four Noble Truths, it is the non-knowledge of one's 'past pre-natal lives' and 'post-mortem future lives' and of dependent arising.

Mahayana

The Mahayana tradition considers ignorance about the nature of reality and immemorial past lives to be a primordial force, which can only be broken through the insight of Emptiness (sunyata). However, compared to other Buddhist traditions, states Jens Braarvig, Avidyā is not so much emphasised, instead the emphasis on "construing an illusory reality" based on conceptualisation when the ultimate reality is Emptiness.

Avidya is the greatest impurity and the primary cause of suffering, rebirth. The insight into Emptiness, state Garfield and Edelglass, that is the "lack of inherent nature of all phenomena, including the self, cuts the impurities", an insight into Emptiness yields full awakening.

Vajrayana

The Vajrayana tradition considers ignorance as fetters of bondage into samsara, and its teachings have focused on a Tantric path under the guidance of a teacher, to remove Avidya and achieve liberation in a single lifetime.

Avidyā is identified as the first of the twelve links of dependent origination (twelve nidanas)—a sequence of links that describe why a being reincarnates and remains bound within the samsara, a cycle of repeated births and deaths in six realms of existence. The twelve nidanas are an application of the Buddhist concept of pratītyasamutpāda (dependent origination). This theory, presented in Samyutta Nikaya II.2–4 and Digha Nikaya II.55–63, asserts that rebirth, re-aging and re-death ultimately arise through a series of twelve links or nidanas ultimately rooted in Avidyā, and the twelfth step Jarāmaraṇa triggers the dependent origination of Avidyā, recreating an unending cycle of dukkha (suffering, pain, unsatisfactoriness).

Removing avidya 

Avidya or ignorance can be eliminated directly by cultivating its opposite viz. Knowledge, wisdom and perception, where the above refer to the true knowledge and perception of reality. 
The various ways to remove Avidya is by learning from a Guru/teacher who knows, or from books and scriptures. Avidya can also be removed through Meditation or the practice of Dhyana and Yoga. Through practice of Dharma and righteousness, Avidya gets removed. 
Unrighteous karma increases Ignorance, while Ignorance perpetuates Adharma.

See also
 Avidya (Hinduism)
 Kleshas (Buddhism) 
 Maya (illusion)
 Mental factors (Buddhism)
 Tanha for a complementary root of suffering in Buddhism.
 Three poisons (Buddhism)
 Twelve Nidanas

Notes

References

Sources
 
 
 
 
 
 
 
 
 
 Ajahn Sucitto (2010). Turning the Wheel of Truth: Commentary on the Buddha's First Teaching. Shambhala.
 Bhikkhu Bodhi (2003), A Comprehensive Manual of Abhidhamma, Pariyatti Publishing
 Chogyam Trungpa (1972). "Karma and Rebirth: The Twelve Nidanas, by Chogyam Trungpa Rinpoche." Karma and the Twelve Nidanas, A Sourcebook for the Shambhala School of Buddhist Studies. Vajradhatu Publications.
 Dalai Lama (1992). The Meaning of Life, translated and edited by Jeffrey Hopkins, Boston: Wisdom.
 Mingyur Rinpoche (2007). The Joy of Living: Unlocking the Secret and Science of Happiness. Harmony. Kindle Edition.
 Sonam Rinchen (2006). How Karma Works: The Twelve Links of Dependent Arising, Snow Lion.

Further reading
Daniel Goleman: Vital Lies, Simple Truths: The Psychology of Self Deception (1985) Bloomsbury Publishing. 
Avijja Sutta Translated from the Pali by Thanissaro Bhikkhu

Ignorance
Unwholesome factors in Buddhism
Twelve nidānas
Sanskrit words and phrases